Simsim, known to the Crusaders as Semsem, was a Palestinian village, located  northeast of Gaza. It was depopulated just prior to the outbreak of 1948 Arab-Israeli war. On 12 May 1948, pre-state Israeli forces expelled the villagers, along with those of the neighboring village of Najd.

History
Simsim contained two archaeological sites known locally as ar-Ras and Sha'fat al-Mughur (the latter of which contained a Roman cemetery).  Byzantine ceramics have been found here. The village was known as Semsem to the Crusaders.

Ottoman period
Simsim was incorporated into the Ottoman Empire in 1517 with all of Palestine, and by 1596 it was  part of  the nahiya (subdistrict) of Gaza under the liwa' (district) of Sanjak of Gaza,  and it had  20 Muslim households, an estimated  population of 110. They  paid a fixed tax rate of 33,3% on a number of crops, including wheat, barley and fruit trees, as well as on goats and beehives; a total of 6,800 Akçe. 14/24 of the revenue went to a Waqf.

In 1838, Simsim  was noted   as was a Muslim village  in the Gaza District.

In A Handbook for Travellers in Syria and Palestine (1858), Josias Leslie Porter describes the village as standing "amidst a little grove of trees, about a 1/4 mile north of the road."
In June 1863 Victor Guérin found the village to contains five hundred inhabitants. Surrounded by trees, the village had tobacco and sesame plantations. A oualy, dedicated to Neby Danyal,  was internally decorated with two ancient columns.  An Ottoman village list of about 1870 indicated 69 houses and a population of 119, though  the population count included only men.

In 1883, the PEF's Survey of Western Palestine described Simsim as being surrounded by gardens. It had a well, a pool, and an olive grove that was planted to the north.

Karl Baedeker and his travelling companions writing in 1894 are more specific, noting that the village is located in an olive grove and that tobacco and sesame are the principal crops grown there.

British Mandate of Palestine period
In the 1922 census of Palestine conducted by the British Mandate authorities, Semsem had a population of 760 inhabitants, all Muslims, increasing in  the 1931 census, when Sumsum had a population of 855 Muslims in 195 houses. 

 
 

In 1942, the kibbutz of Gvar'am was established on land traditionally belonging to the village.

In the 1945 statistics, the population of Sumsum consisted of  1,290 Muslims and 70 Jews, while  the total land area was 16,797 dunams, according to an official land and population survey. Of this, a total of  240 dunams  were used  citrus and bananas, 252 dunams were plantations and irrigable land, 15,582 for cereals, while 44 dunams were built-up areas.

1948 war and after
During the 1948 Arab–Israeli War the villagers of Simsim, together with the surrounding villages, were driven out by  soldiers from the Negev Brigade on 12–13 May 1948 as part of Operation Barak. In Simsim the occupying troops found only a handful of old people. They blew up five houses and warned that if the village's weapons were not handed over the following day, they would blow up the rest.  But the inhabitants repeatedly returned to the village, either to resettle or to cultivate crops. At the end of May, a Negev Brigade unit, with orders to expel "the Arabs from Sumsum and Burayr and burn their granaries and fields", swept through the villages, encountering resistance in Sumsum, and killed "5" (or, according to another report, "20") and blew up granaries and a well. The Israeli troops returned to Simsim yet again, on 9 or 10 June 1948, again burning houses and skirmishing with Arabs.

Or HaNer, established in 1957,  lie less than one km south of the village site, on land formerly belonging to Najd, Gaza.

In 1992, the village site was described: "The village has been obliterated and can only be  recognised from the cypress and sycamore trees that still remain. A  pile of stones that may be the debris of a village building is visible. The site is fenced in and serves as a pasture. The land in the vicinity are cultivated by Israeli farmers."

People from Simsim
Jamil Majdalawi

References

Bibliography

Baedeker, K., A. Socin and Immanuel Benzinger (1894). Palestine and Syria: Handbook for Travellers. Harvard University. 

 
 
     
 
 
  
 

 
  
Porter, J.L.,  (1858). A Handbook for Travellers in Syria and Palestine. Harvard University.

External links
Welcome To Simsim
Simsim, Zochrot
Survey of Western Palestine, Map 20:   IAA, Wikimedia commons 
Simsim from the Khalil Sakakini Cultural Center
Tour to Simsim Yoav Bachar, 28.3.09, Zochrot

District of Gaza
Arab villages depopulated prior to the 1948 Arab–Israeli War